Nelson Philip Ashmole (born 11 January 1934 in Amersham, Buckinghamshire), commonly known as Philip Ashmole, is an English zoologist and conservationist. His main research field focused on the avifauna of islands, including Saint Helena, Ascension Island, Tenerife, the Azores, and Kiritimati. Other interests include insects and spiders, of which Ashmole discovered and described some new taxa.

Career
In 1957, Ashmole graduated to Bachelor of Arts in Zoology at Brasenose College in Oxford. In the same year he became a research student at the Edward Grey Institute of Field Ornithology (EGI) and accompanied the scientists' couple Bernard and Sally Stonehouse and the ornithologist Doug Dorward on a two-year expedition of the British Ornithologists' Union to Ascension Island in the South Atlantic. Ashmole studied here the breeding and moult cycles of terns, which he wrote about in his Oxford doctoral thesis, entitled The Biology of Certain Terns: With Special Reference to Black Noddy Anous tenuirostris and the Wideawake Sterna fuscata on Ascension Island. In 1960, Ashmole married Myrtle Jane Goodacre, whom he met at a students' conference in 1957. Myrtle Goodacre worked as researcher and librarian at the EGI and became Ashmole's collaborator in many research projects.  The couple has one son and two daughters.

Postdoctoral Ashmole worked as demonstrator at the University of Oxford in 1960. He also was active as a research officer at the EGI until 1963. Through the mediation of David Lack, who worked with G. Evelyn Hutchinson at the EGI, Ashmole received a summer research fellowship at the Peabody Museum of Yale University. Subsequently, the Ashmoles spent a year in Hawaii on a Yale fellowship at the Bernice P. Bishop Museum from where they studied feeding ecology and breeding cycles of terns and other seabirds on Kiritimati, as well as trying to assess the effects of nuclear weapons testing on sea birds. Subsequently, Ashmole served as assistant and associate professor at Yale University, where he did research work until 1972. From 1972 to 1992 he held the post of lecturer and senior lecturer at the University of Edinburgh.

Ashmole collected subfossil material of extinct bird species, including the Saint Helena hoopoe, the Ascension night heron and the Ascension crake. During a month-long research period on fossil birds on Saint Helena in 1959, Ashmole and his colleague Doug Dorward discovered the forceps pincers of the Saint Helena earwig, a species which was rediscovered in 1965 for a short term.

Philip and Myrtle Ashmole are also active in the nature conservation movement. Most notable is the restoration of Carrifran Wildwood in the Southern Uplands of Scotland. For that and other projects the Ashmoles helped to found the Borders Forest Trust, an environmental charity, in 1996, of which Philip Ashmole has been a long-serving trustee.

In 2015, Philip and Myrtle Ashmole received the Lifetime Achievement Award at the RSPB Nature of Scotland Awards.

Ashmole's halo
Ashmole's work on Ascension Island led him to propose a hypothesis about how large concentrations of seabirds might be able to deplete forage fish resources in the vicinity of their
breeding colonies, creating a zone of reduced food availability that would influence foraging and breeding success and behaviour. This zone was later termed "Ashmole's halo" by other researchers. The concept has since been widely used in ecological studies of seabirds, and found to apply in varying degrees to many different species and ecological regions.

Selected works
P. Ashmole, M. Ashmole: Comparative Feeding Ecology of Sea Birds of a Tropical Oceanic Island. Peabody Museum of Natural History, Yale University, 1967
M. Ashmole, P. Ashmole: Natural history excursions in Tenerife: A guide to the countryside, plants and animals. Kidston Mill Press, 1989. 
P. Ashmole, M. Ashmole: St. Helena and Ascension Island: a natural history. Anthony Nelson, Oswestry, 2000. 
M. Ashmole, P. Ashmole: The Carrifran Wildwood Story: Ecological Restoration from the Grass Roots, Borders Forest Trust, 2009. 
P. Ashmole, M. Ashmole: Natural History of Tenerife, Whittles Publishing, Dunbeath, 2016.

References

External links
Official website by Philip and Myrtle Ashmole

1934 births
Living people
English ornithologists
English entomologists
English conservationists
British arachnologists
Alumni of Brasenose College, Oxford
People from Amersham